Anthony Degrate (born April 25, 1962) is a former American college and professional football player who was a defensive end in the National Football League (NFL) for a single season in 1985.  He played college football for the University of Texas, and was recognized as a consensus All-American.  He was selected by the Cincinnati Bengals in the 1985 NFL Draft, and played professionally for the NFL's Green Bay Packers.

Early years
Degrate was born in Snyder, Texas.  He attended Snyder High School, and played high school football for the Snyder Tigers.

College career
He received an athletic scholarship to attend the University of Texas at Austin, where he played for coach Fred Akers' Texas Longhorns football team from 1981 to 1984.  He was a first-team All-Southwest Conference (SWC) selection in 1983 and 1984, and was a key member of the 1983 Longhorns team that won the SWC championship and finished 11–1.  As a senior team captain in 1984, he led the team in tackles and quarterback sacks, was recognized as a consensus first-team All-American, and won the Lombardi Award honoring the best lineman in college football.

Professional career
The Cincinnati Bengals drafted Degrate in the fifth round of the 1985 NFL Draft.  He played in a single professional game for the Green Bay Packers during the  season.

See also

 1984 College Football All-America Team
 List of University of Texas at Austin alumni
 Texas Longhorns

References

1962 births
Living people
All-American college football players
American football defensive ends
Green Bay Packers players
People from Snyder, Texas
Texas Longhorns football players